Events from the year 1985 in Italy

Incumbents
 President: Sandro Pertini (until 29 June), Francesco Cossiga (starting 3 July)
 Prime Minister: Bettino Craxi

Events

Births
7 February – Devis Nossa, footballer
8 July – Emanuele Abate, hurdler
31 August – Serena Rossi, actress
25 October – Nicola Fontanive, ice hockey player 
27 October – Stefano Bianco, motorcycle racer (d. 2020)

Deaths

See also
 1985 in Italian television
 List of Italian films of 1985

References 

 
1980s in Italy
Years of the 20th century in Italy
Italy
Italy